Bayou Romance is a 1982 television film and part of the Romance Theatre series.

External links

1982 television films
1982 films
American television films
Films directed by Alan Myerson